Blab! was an anthology edited by Monte Beauchamp that featured a mixture of alternative comics and illustrated features focused predominantly on illustration, graphic design, and lowbrow art.

The first two issues (1986–87) were published by Beauchamp's own imprint, Monte Comix. In 1988 Kitchen Sink Press took over the title, publishing issues #3-8 as well as printing new editions of issues #1 and 2. Issues #9–18 were published annually by Fantagraphics between 1997 and 2007 in a 120-page, 10" x 10" square format featuring both black-and-white and color art. In 2010 Last Gasp revived the series for two issues under the title Blab World.

In 2003, Chronicle Books published the book collection New & Used Blab!. As the title suggests, one half of the book consists of selections from previous issues while the other half (bound dos-à-dos style) features new works by frequent contributors. Several solo books by individual Blab! contributors were published with the subtitle "A Blab! Storybook".

Dark Horse Comics announced that the anthology would return in May 2023 under the title Comics and Stories That Will Make You BLAB!

Contributors

 Doug Allen
 Gary Baseman
 Stéphane Blanquet
 Marc Burckhardt
 Charles Burns
 Rob & Christian Clayton
 Daniel Clowes
 Sue Coe
 Joe Coleman
 Al Columbia
 Howard Cruse
 Charles Dallas
 Kim Deitch
 Daniel Divox
 Mary Fleener
 Drew Friedman
 Camille Rose Garcia
 Justin Green
 Bill Griffith
 Matti Hagelberg
 Tom Huck
 Kaz
 J. D. King
 Kris Kuksi
 Peter Kuper
 Terry LaBan
 Gary Leib
 Laura Levine
 Jay Lynch
 Mark Mothersbaugh
 Gary Panter
 Archer Prewitt
 Spain Rodriguez
 Sergio Ruzzier
 Mark Ryden
 Ryan Heshka
 Richard Sala
 Gilbert Shelton
 Frank Stack
 Gary Taxali
 Chris Ware
 Robert Williams
 Skip Williamson
 Brook Slane

References

External links
 BlabWorld.com
 Fantagraphics Books: Blab!
 The Blab! Show, a gallery show of Blab! contributors

Comics anthologies
Fantagraphics titles
Kitchen Sink Press titles